The Snowmobile Association of Massachusetts or (SAM) develops and maintains an expanding interconnected snowmobile trail system. There are approximately 9,000 members in the SAM. Snowmobiling has an economic impact of $65 million per year in Massachusetts. The trails allow snowmobilers to travel as far as from Worcester County to the Berkshires. Unlike other nearby states, SAM receives no state funding and relys only on funds from members.

References

Outdoor recreation organizations
Organizations based in Massachusetts
Sports in Massachusetts
Snowmobiles